Gordon C. Stauffer (May 21, 1930 – September 23, 2019) was an American college basketball coach. He was the head men's basketball coach at Indiana State University; leading their transition from NCAA College Division (now Division II) to Division I and membership in the Midwestern Conference and ultimately the Missouri Valley Conference.

Stauffer also coached at Washburn University, Indiana University-Purdue University Fort Wayne (IPFW), at Geneva College, and his last college position was at Nicholls State, where he coached the Colonels from 1981 to 1990, again leading the school through a transition period from Div II to Div I.

Stauffer was preceded by his son in death. He left behind his two daughters, his wife, and four grandchildren. He died on September 23, 2019, due to complications of sepsis.

Playing career
A Fort Wayne, Indiana South High star, led the Archers to Sectional and Regional titles in his Junior season (1947); he was tabbed 'Honorable Mention All-State' and attended Michigan State on a basketball scholarship; while at Michigan State, he was a member of their first Big Ten conference team; the second-leading scorer in 1952 and lettered three seasons for the Spartans.
He was coached by two coaches, most notably Hall-of-Famer Pete Newell.

Stauffer was drafted in the 1952 NBA draft by the Indianapolis Olympians.
While he was the first Michigan State player ever picked in an NBA draft, he never played for the Olympians.

Coaching career
To begin his coaching career, Stauffer moved into the high school coaching ranks in his home state of Indiana, where he coached the Royerton Redbirds from 1955 to 1959. He left Royerton to move into the college coaching ranks at the University of South Carolina, where he assisted Walt Hambrick and Bob Stevens; he then moved to the University of Oklahoma with Bob Stevens as the top assistant.

He got his first head coaching job with Washburn University; after a winning season in his first year, he moved up the ranks to Indiana State. After eight seasons in Terre Haute at Indiana State, he took the head job at Indiana University_Purdue University – Fort Wayne. He then spent two seasons at Geneva College, leading them to the NCCAA playoffs in each season. After Geneva College, Stauffer spent nine seasons at Nicholls State before retiring to Florida.

Personal life
Stauffer died on September 23, 2019, at age 89.

Head coaching record

References

1930 births
2019 deaths
American men's basketball coaches
American men's basketball players
Basketball coaches from Indiana
Basketball players from Fort Wayne, Indiana
Geneva Golden Tornadoes men's basketball coaches
Indianapolis Olympians draft picks
Indiana State Sycamores men's basketball coaches
Purdue Fort Wayne Mastodons men's basketball coaches
Michigan State Spartans men's basketball players
Nicholls Colonels men's basketball coaches
Oklahoma Sooners men's basketball coaches
South Carolina Gamecocks men's basketball coaches
Sportspeople from Fort Wayne, Indiana
Washburn Ichabods men's basketball coaches